Bustin' + Dronin' is a remix compilation/live album by the band Blur. It was originally only released in Japan but was also released in limited quantities in the UK and the US, and being released only on double-CD format. The first disc featured all the remixed songs from the band's eponymous album, Blur. After five albums with the same producer (Stephen Street), Food Records turned the songs from Blur over to other producers for remixing. The band later chose William Orbit to produce their sixth studio album, 13. The second disc featured their live at John Peel's live session called "Peel Acres". Due to its low key, limited release in the UK, Bustin' + Dronin only reached number 50 on the albums chart, though it is the only import release by the band to chart in the UK.

The album was reissued in 2022 on coloured vinyl and CD as a Record Store Day exclusive, making it the first time it has been available on the vinyl format. However, the live album part at Peel Acres which available on the original release was omitted for the reissue.

Track listing

Personnel 

 Miti Adhikari – engineer
 Damon Albarn – vocals
 Alan Branch – engineer
 Cesare – turntables
 Graham Coxon – cover art concept
 Alison Howe – producer
 Alex James – group member
 John McEntire – remixing
 Moby – producer, remixing
 Thurston Moore – mixing
 William Orbit – producer, remixing
 Jeff Parker – guitar
 Dave Rowntree – group member
 Adrian Sherwood – mixing
 John Smith – engineer
 Stephen Street – producer

Charts and certifications

Weekly charts

Certifications

References

External links

''Bustin' + Dronin''' at YouTube (streamed copy where licensed)

Blur (band) albums
Albums produced by Stephen Street
B-side compilation albums
1998 live albums
1998 compilation albums
1998 remix albums
EMI Records remix albums
EMI Records live albums
EMI Records compilation albums